Li Shan may refer to:

 Li Shan (painter) (1686–1762), Qing dynasty painter
 Joseph Li Shan (born 1965), Roman Catholic archbishop of Beijing
 Li Shan (volleyball) (born 1980), Chinese volleyball player
 Li Shan, Eastern Han official, author of the influential commentaries to the Wen Xuan anthology
 Li Shan, prefect of Nhat-nam during the reign of Emperor Ming of Han 
 Li Shan, circuit intendant of Shanghai under the Qing

Places 
 Lishan District, a county in China